Qeyapa (also Romanized as Qeyāpā, Qīāpā, and Qīyāpā; also known as Ghīyapa) is a village in Rostaq Rural District, in the Central District of Khomeyn County, Markazi Province, Iran. At the 2006 census, its population was 53, in 16 families.

References 

Populated places in Khomeyn County